X-CD-Roast is a GTK+ front-end for cdrtools which provides a graphical user interface (GUI) for CD authoring.

X-CD-Roast runs on Linux and other Unix-like computer operating systems. Released under the GNU General Public License, X-CD-Roast is free software.

Features 

 CD-Text reading/editing/writing support

Comparison
X-CD-Roast was an early GUI front-end for unix-like systems, which has subsequently been reviewed as more primitive than other CD authoring software.

References

External links 
 

Optical disc-related software that uses GTK
Free optical disc authoring software
Linux CD/DVD writing software